Nu Centauri, Latinized from ν Centauri, is a binary star system in the southern constellation of Centaurus. The combined apparent visual magnitude of the pair is +3.41, making this one of the brightest members of the constellation. The margin of error for this distance is about 2%, which is enough to give an error in distance of ±10 light years.

This is a single-lined spectroscopic binary system, which means that the two stellar components have not been individually resolved with a telescope. Instead, their orbital motion can be tracked through periodic shifts in the spectrum of the primary. The gravitational perturbation of the hidden secondary component upon the primary is causing the latter to first move toward and then away from the Earth, creating Doppler shift changes in the spectrum. From these subtle shifts, the orbital elements of the pair can be extracted. The pair are orbiting their common center of mass in a circular orbit with a period of only 2.622 days, indicating that they are in a relatively tight orbit.

The interaction between the two components of this system appears to be creating emission lines in the spectrum, turning the primary into a Be star. It has a stellar classification of B2 IV, which matches a massive B-type subgiant star. The primary has 8.5 times the mass of the Sun and 6.4 times the Sun's radius. It is a Beta Cephei type variable star with a brightness that periodically varies from magnitude +3.38 to +3.41 over an interval of 0.17 days. The tidal interaction with the secondary component has turned it into a rotating ellipsoidal variable.

This star system is a proper motion member of the Upper Centaurus–Lupus sub-group in the Scorpius–Centaurus OB association, the nearest such association of co-moving massive stars to the Sun.

References

B-type subgiants
Beta Cephei variables
Rotating ellipsoidal variables
Spectroscopic binaries
Upper Centaurus Lupus

Centaurus (constellation)
Centauri, Nu
Durchmusterung objects
120307
067464
5190